IMVT can stand for:
the Institute for Micro Process Engineering at the Karlsruhe Research Center
Institut für Mechanische Verfahrenstechnik der Universität Stuttgart (Institute for Mechanical Process Engineering) at Stuttgart University
Intermediate Value Theorem